Skælingur is a village on the west of the main Faroese island of Streymoy in the Kvívík Municipality.

The 2010 population was 13. Its postal code is FO 336. It is by the mountain Skælingsfjall, one of the tallest mountains in the archipelago with a height of 767 metres.

Photo gallery

See also
 List of towns in the Faroe Islands

References

External links
Personal Danish site with photographs of Skælingur
 Hagstova.fo

Populated places in the Faroe Islands